Le Carillon is an EP of 1950s-inspired love songs by the American alternative rock band The Autumns, released in 2001.  For this album, they were reunited with producer Andrew D. Prickett.

The album was released on limited edition pink vinyl, as well as compact disc.

Track listing
"Thieves in Blue"
"Quite"
"Slow Kiss"
"She Whispers the Winter Snow"

Carillon, Le
2001 EPs